Khanindra Chandra Chowdhury ( UGC, EMERITUS, (retd.) Professor of Mathematics, Gauhati University) is an Indian mathematician who is well known for his extensive research work in Pure Mathematics especially in Algebra. His field of interests includes Mathematical Analysis, Graph Theory, Number Theory, Topology, Axiomatic Projective Geometry and Mathematical Logic.

He is well known for putting forward the concept of what is known as the Goldie Module Structure and Goldie Near-Ring. Some of his works were reviewed by mathematicians like Gunter Pilz and he was invited to give a talk on the same in the 90s in Johannes Kepler University. Moreover, he has also introduced the notions of Hypergraph ring, Hypergraph near-ring and Hypergraph near-ring group, - a novel concept linking topology and algebra.

This is a notion of some kind of space-biased aspect of Hypergraph .

He has to his credit a number of books pertaining to research as well as textbooks for university and college students.

Apart from his contribution to contemporary education in mathematics, he is an exponent of popularizing the subject and encouraging young students to take up mathematics as a career by actively participating in various camps for Mathematical Olympiad [National Board of Higher Mathematics, India] and exhibition on various topics in mathematics.

His first book on popular mathematics – Ganit Ati Biroktikor Bixoy, গণিতএটি বিৰক্তিকৰ বিষয়! is in Assamese, an Indian language and has been widely acclaimed as a rich source of knowledge encompassing various topics such as continued fractions and number theory. Although targeted at laymen it is an equally fascinating and appealing book for experts too. As a doctoral advisor to various research scholars, the relevant works have received good commendations. He is on the editorial board for various international journals and also associated as a reviewer of some others.
Some of his writings  in various magazines and news papers  on  layman mathematics, culture, and social problems or contexts are listed below.

In addition to his academic work, Chowdhury has also written a dramatic play, Ramanujan Katha, about the life of mathematician Srinivasa Ramanujan.

Books

 গণিত এটি বিৰক্তিকৰ বিষয় ! -Ganit Eti Biroktikor Bixoy, A collection of articles on mathematics of common interest in Assamese, (First Edition-1990, Second Edition-2010)
 ৰামানুজনঃ গণিতজ্ঞ আৰু মানুহজন- Ramanujan- Ganitagya Aaru Manuhjon, An Assamese open translation of S.R. Ranganathan's Ramanujan -The Man And The Mathematician, 2011:, published by Assam Academy of Mathematics
 ৰামানুজন খ্যাত হোৱাৰ আঁৰৰ কিতাপখন-  Ramanujan Khyato Hoar Aanror Kitapkhon- A brief popular exposition on G. S. Carr's book in connection with Ramanujan, published by Assam Academy of Mathematics, 2012:

See also
 Uniform module
 International Congress of Mathematicians

References

1948 births
Living people
20th-century Indian mathematicians
Cotton College, Guwahati alumni
Gauhati University alumni
Panjab University alumni
People from Assam